

Yanarraju Lake (possibly from Quechua yana black, rahu snow, ice, mountain with snow, "black snow peak") is a lake in the Cordillera Blanca in the Andes of  Peru located in the Ancash Region, Asunción Province, Chacas District. It lies near Contrahierbas.

See also 
 Huajramarca

References 

Lakes of Peru
Lakes of Ancash Region